Creighton Hale (born Patrick Wills Fitzgerald; May 24, 1882 – August 9, 1965) was an Irish-American theatre, film, and television actor whose career extended more than a half-century, from the early 1900s to the end of the 1950s.

Career
Born in County Cork, Ireland, Hale was one of two children born to Maud V. Hale and Daniel Fitzgerald. Educated in Dublin and London, he later attended Ardingly College in Sussex. He emigrated to America in 1910, with a company headed by Gertrude Elliott. Remaining in the country, he acted in stock theater in Hartford, Indianapolis, and other cities, billed initially as Pat Creighton Hale. While starring in Charles Frohman's Broadway production of Indian Summer, Hale was spotted by a representative of the Pathe Film Company. He eventually became known simply as Creighton Hale, although the derivation of "Creighton" remains unknown. Making his screen debut in The Exploits of Elaine (1914), Hale had prominent supporting roles in films like D.W. Griffith's Way Down East, Orphans of the Storm, and The Idol Dancer, and later starred in such films as The Marriage Circle, Seven Footprints to Satan and The Cat and the Canary. Regarding the latter, Picture Show wrote of Hale's performance, "He makes no attempt to be impressive. He is just natural."

It was thought that in 1923 Hale starred in an early pornographic "stag" film On the Beach (a.k.a. Getting His Goat and The Goat Man). In the film, three nude women agree to have sex with him, but only through a hole in a fence. Photographs of the scene clearly show that the man in the film is not Hale, but is another actor who also wore glasses.

When talkies came about, Hale's career declined. He made several appearances in Hal Roach's Our Gang series (School's Out, Big Ears, Free Wheeling), and also played uncredited bits in major talking films such as Larceny, Inc., The Maltese Falcon, and Casablanca.

Personal life
Hale's two sons, Creighton Hale Jr. and Robert Lowe Hale, from his first marriage to Victoire Lowe, were adopted by Lowe's second husband, actor John Miljan. After his divorce, Hale married Kathleen Bering in Los Angeles in 1931. 

Hale's sister-in-law, Isabelle Lowe, was both an accomplished stage actress and a published author and aspiring playwright. She and Hale performed together at least twice during the early 1920s—co-starring in revivals of Rida Johnson Young's Little Old New York and A.E. Thomas's Just Suppose—and co-authored two never-produced plays.

Hale died at the Motion Picture Country Home on August 9, 1965 at age 83. In accordance with his wishes, no funeral service was held, his remains were cremated at Chapel of the Pines, and his ashes were brought to rest at Duncans Mills Cemetery in Northern California.

Selected filmography

 The Million Dollar Mystery (1914) – Gang Member (film debut)
 The Stain (1914) – Office Clerk
 The Taint (1914) – Walter, Madame Bartlett's Son
 The Three of Us (1914) – Clem
 The Exploits of Elaine (1914, Serial) – Walter Jameson (Ep. 1, 2, 3, 6)
 A Fool There Was (1915) – Minor Role
 The New Exploits of Elaine (1915) – Walter Jameson
 The Romance of Elaine (1915, Serial) – Reuben Whitcomb
 Hazel Kirke (1916) – Pittacus Greene
 The Iron Claw (1916, Serial) – Davey
 Charity (1916) – Jimmie Fleming (Mary's brother)
 Snow White (1916) – Prince Florimond
 The Seven Pearls (1917) – Harry Drake
 Mrs. Slacker (1918) – Robert Gibbs
 For Sale (1918) – Waverly Hamilton
 Annexing Bill (1918) – Billy
 Waifs (1918) – Fitzjames Powers
 His Bonded Wife (1918) – Philip Hazard
 The Woman the Germans Shot (1918) – Frank Brooks
 The Great Victory (1919) – Conrad Le Brett
 Oh, Boy! (1919) – George Budd
 The Thirteenth Chair (1919) – Willy Grosby
 The Love Cheat (1919) – Henry Calvin
 A Damsel in Distress (1919) – George Bevan
 The Black Circle (1919) – Andrew MacTavish Ferguson
 The Idol Dancer (1920) – Walter Kincaid
 A Child for Sale (1920) – Charles Stoddard
 Way Down East (1920) – Professor Sterling
 Forbidden Love (1921) – Harold Van Zandt
 Orphans of the Storm (1921) – Picard
 Fascination (1922) – Carlos de Lisa (her brother)
 Her Majesty (1922) – Ted Harper
 Mary of the Movies (1923) – The Boy
 Three Wise Fools (1923) – Young Trumbull
 Trilby (1923) – Little Billee
 Broken Hearts of Broadway (1923) – An Outcast
 Tea: With a Kick! (1923) – Art Binger
 The Marriage Circle (1924) – Dr. Gustav Mueller
 Name the Man (1924) – Alick Gell
 How to Educate a Wife (1924) – Billy Breese
 Riders Up (1924) – Johnny, aka Information Kid
 Wine of Youth (1924) – Richard (1897 prologue)
 The Mine with the Iron Door (1924) – St. Jimmy
 This Woman (1924) – Bobby Bleedon
 The Bridge of Sighs (1925) – Billy Craig
 Seven Days (1925) – Jim Wilson
 The Circle (1925) – Arnold Cheney
 Exchange of Wives (1925) – Victor Moran
 Time, the Comedian (1925) – Tom Cautley
 The Shadow on the Wall (1925) – George Walters
 Wages for Wives (1925) – Danny Kester
 Beverly of Graustark (1926) – Prince Oscar
 A Poor Girl's Romance (1926) – Wellington Kingston
 The Midnight Message (1926) – Billy Dodd
 Oh, Baby! (1926) – Arthur Graham
 Speeding Through (1926)
 Should Men Walk Home? (1927, Short) – The Gentleman Crook
 Why Girls Say No (1927, Short) – Becky's Boyfriend
 One Hour Married (1927, Short)
 Annie Laurie (1927) – Donald
 Thumbs Down (1927) – Richard Hale
 The Cat and the Canary (1927) – Paul Jones
 Rose-Marie (1928) – Etienne Doray
 Riley of the Rainbow Division (1928) – Riley
 Sisters of Eve (1928) – Leonard Tavernake
 The House of Shame (1928) – Harvey Baremore
 Seven Footprints to Satan (1929) – James Kirkham
 The Great Divide (1929) – Edgar Blossom
 Holiday (1930) – Pete Hedges
 School's Out (1930, Short) – Jack Crabtree – Miss Crabtree's Brother
 Big Ears (1931, Short) – Wheezer's father
 Grief Street (1931) – Ted
 Prestige (1931) – Lieutenant at Engagement Party (uncredited)
 The Greeks Had a Word for Them (1932) – Wedding Supervisor (uncredited)
 Shop Angel (1932) – Maxie Morton
 Free Wheeling (1932, Short) – Dickie's Father
 Sensation Hunters (1933) – Fred Barrett
 The Masquerader (1933) – Bobby Blessington (uncredited)
 Only Yesterday (1933) – (uncredited)
 What's Your Racket? (1934) – Chief
 Gambling Lady (1934) – Funeral Attendee (uncredited)
 George White's Scandals (1934) – Theatre Treasurer (uncredited)
 The Thin Man (1934) – Reporter (uncredited)
 Bulldog Drummond Strikes Back (1934) – Wedding Guest (uncredited)
 The President Vanishes (1934) – Wardell's Secretary (uncredited)
 Helldorado (1935) – Newspaper Reporter (uncredited)
 Mystery Woman (1935) – Radio Operator (uncredited)
 One More Spring (1935) – Minor Role (uncredited)
 Life Begins at 40 (1935) – Drug Clerk (uncredited)
 Million Dollar Haul (1935) – Arthur 'Curley' Roberts
 Becky Sharp (1935) – British Officer (uncredited)
 Men Without Names (1935) – Groom
 Death from a Distance (1935) – Witness (uncredited)
 Your Uncle Dudley (1935) – Auto Salesman (uncredited)
 Custer's Last Stand (1936, Serial) – Hank
 The Music Goes 'Round (1936) – Man on the Street (uncredited)
 The Millionaire Kid (1936) – Thomas Neville
 Till We Meet Again (1936) – English Artillery Officer (uncredited)
 The Country Beyond (1936) – Mountie (uncredited)
 The Crime of Dr. Forbes (1936) – Student Doctor (uncredited)
 36 Hours to Kill (1936) – Ticket Agent (uncredited)
 Hollywood Boulevard (1936) – Himself – Actor at Trocadero Bar
 Under Your Spell (1936) – Bailiff (uncredited)
 Find the Witness (1937) – Bell Captain
 Step Lively, Jeeves! (1937) – Reporter (uncredited)
 Midnight Taxi (1937) – G-Man (uncredited)
 Charlie Chan on Broadway (1937) – Reporter (uncredited)
 Big Town Girl (1937) – Desk Man (uncredited)
 International Settlement (1938) – Clerk (uncredited)
 One Wild Night (1938) – Bank Teller (uncredited)
 Meet the Girls (1938) – Assistant Bartender (uncredited)
 Confessions of a Nazi Spy (1939) – Draftsman (uncredited)
 Nancy Drew... Trouble Shooter (1939) – Man in Sheriff's Office (uncredited)
 Indianapolis Speedway (1939) – Racetrack Official (uncredited)
 The Cowboy Quarterback (1939) – Broadcaster (uncredited)
 Torchy Blane... Playing with Dynamite (1939) – Hotel Desk Clerk
 Everybody's Hobby (1939) – Hatfield's Reporter (uncredited)
 Nancy Drew and the Hidden Staircase (1939) – Reporter
 Dust Be My Destiny (1939) – Nick's Second Customer (uncredited)
 On Your Toes (1939) – First Stage Manager (uncredited)
 Pride of the Blue Grass (1939) – English Announcer (uncredited)
 On Dress Parade (1939) – Doctor Telling Cadets 'No Visitors' (uncredited)
 The Roaring Twenties (1939) – Customer (uncredited)
 Kid Nightingale (1939) – Man Answering Telephone at Lessernan's Gymnasium (uncredited)
 The Return of Doctor X (1939) – Hotel Manager
 A Child Is Born (1939) – Elevator Operator (uncredited)
 Calling Philo Vance (1940) – Du Bois – Fingerprint Man
 Granny Get Your Gun (1940) – Second Reporter (uncredited)
 One Million B.C. (1940) – Shell Person
 King of the Lumberjacks (1940) – Cashier (uncredited)
 Tear Gas Squad (1940) – Police Announcer (uncredited)
 Saturday's Children (1940) – Stamp Collecting Mailman (uncredited)
 Flight Angels (1940) – San Francisco Airport Attendant (uncredited)
 Brother Orchid (1940) – Reporter #3 (uncredited)
 A Fugitive from Justice (1940) – Reporter at Train Station (uncredited)
 Gambling on the High Seas (1940) – Nelson – Gambling Loser (uncredited)
 The Man Who Talked Too Much (1940) – Reporter #4 (uncredited)
 All This, and Heaven Too (1940) – Ship's Officer (uncredited)
 My Love Came Back (1940) – Thompson – Music Co. Clerk (uncredited)
 Money and the Woman (1940) – Mack, Bank Customer (uncredited)
 Knute Rockne All American (1940) – Callahan's Secretary (uncredited)
 Tugboat Annie Sails Again (1940) – James – Armstrong's Chauffeur (uncredited)
 East of the River (1940) – Casino Floor Man (uncredited)
 Always a Bride (1940) – First Reporter (uncredited)
 Father Is a Prince (1940) – Lawrence – Bower's Accountant (uncredited)
 Lady with Red Hair (1940) – Reporter Eddie (uncredited)
 She Couldn't Say No (1940) – Jasper – Loafer on Hotel Porch (uncredited)
 Santa Fe Trail (1940) – Telegraph Operator (uncredited)
 Honeymoon for Three (1941) – Ticket Agent (uncredited)
 The Strawberry Blonde (1941) – Secretary (uncredited)
 The Great Mr. Nobody (1941) – Man Buying Newspaper (uncredited)
 Footsteps in the Dark (1941) – Mr. Harlan (uncredited)
 Here Comes Happiness (1941) – Headline Printer (uncredited)
 Knockout (1941) – Second Reporter (uncredited)
 Affectionately Yours (1941) – Hotel Manager with Key (uncredited)
 Out of the Fog (1941) – Pharmacist (uncredited)
 Sergeant York (1941) – Associated Press Man (uncredited)
 The Bride Came C.O.D. (1941) – Reporter #5 (uncredited)
 Bullets for O'Hara (1941) – Jury Foreman (uncredited)
 Bad Men of Missouri (1941) – Bank Representative (uncredited)
 Highway West (1941) – Waiter (uncredited)
 Dive Bomber (1941) – Hospital Attendant (uncredited)
 The Smiling Ghost (1941) – Collector (uncredited)
 Nine Lives Are Not Enough (1941) – Mahan – Police Fingerprint Expert (uncredited)
 Passage from Hong Kong (1941) – Steamship Clerk (uncredited)
 One Foot in Heaven (1941) – Church Usher (uncredited)
 The Maltese Falcon (1941) – Stenographer (uncredited)
 Law of the Tropics (1941) – Wilson – Clerk (uncredited)
 Blues in the Night (1941) – Gambler at Dice Table (uncredited)
 The Body Disappears (1941) – Prof. Edwards (uncredited)
 Steel Against the Sky (1941) – Jim (uncredited)
 The Man Who Came to Dinner (1942) – Radio Man (uncredited)
 Bullet Scars (1942) – Jess, the Druggist
 The Male Animal (1942) – Reporter (uncredited)
 Murder in the Big House (1942) Ritter – Warden's Secretary
 Larceny, Inc. (1942) – Mr. Carmichael
 Yankee Doodle Dandy (1942) – Telegraph Operator (uncredited)
 Spy Ship (1942) – Reporter (uncredited)
 The Big Shot (1942) – Bit Role (uncredited)
 Wings for the Eagle (1942) – Jeweler (uncredited)
 Escape from Crime (1942) – Durkin (uncredited)
 The Gay Sisters (1942) – Mourner / Courtroom Sketch Artist (uncredited)
 Busses Roar (1942) – The Ticket Agent (uncredited)
 You Can't Escape Forever (1942) – Newspaper Employee Taking Notes (uncredited)
 The Hidden Hand (1942) – The Coroner (uncredited)
 Gentleman Jim (1942) – Championship Fight Spectator (uncredited)
 Casablanca (1942) – Dubious Gambler (uncredited)
 The Gorilla Man (1943) – Constable Fletcher
 The Mysterious Doctor (1943) – Luke (uncredited)
 Action in the North Atlantic (1943) – Sparks (uncredited)
 Watch on the Rhine (1943) – Chauffeur (uncredited)
 Thank Your Lucky Stars (1943) – Engineer (uncredited)
 The Crime Doctor's Strangest Case (1943) – Dr. Carter (uncredited)
 Uncertain Glory (1944) – Prison Secretary (uncredited)
 The Adventures of Mark Twain (1944) – Man with Mule (uncredited)
 Mr. Skeffington (1944) – Casey (uncredited)
 Crime by Night (1944) – Horace Grayson (uncredited)
 The Last Ride (1944) – Air Raid Warden (uncredited)
 Confidential Agent (1945) – Postman (uncredited)
 Three Strangers (1946) – Man in Pub (uncredited)
 A Stolen Life (1946) – Attendant at Wedding Reception (uncredited)
 Her Kind of Man (1946) – Backstage Man (uncredited)
 Janie Gets Married (1946) – Newspaper Worker (uncredited)
 Night and Day (1946) – Man in Theatre (uncredited)
 Two Guys from Milwaukee (1946) – Mayor's Aide (uncredited)
 The Verdict (1946) – Reporter (uncredited)
 Humoresque (1946) – Professor (uncredited)
 Nora Prentiss (1947) – Captain of Waiters, Sea Gull Cafe (uncredited)
 That Way with Women (1947) – Briggs
 The Two Mrs. Carrolls (1947) – Second Tout (uncredited)
 Stallion Road (1947) – Engagement Party Guest (uncredited)
 Love and Learn (1947) – Tom – the Wyngate Butler (uncredited)
 Possessed (1947) – Secretary at Inquest (uncredited)
 The Perils of Pauline (1947) – Marcelled Leading Man
 Cry Wolf (1947) – Dr. Reynolds (uncredited)
 Life with Father (1947) – Mr. Wickersham – Father of Twin Boys (uncredited)
 Always Together (1947) – Eric, Turner's Butler (uncredited)
 April Showers (1948) – Hotel Guest (uncredited)
 The Woman in White (1948) – Underservant (uncredited)
 The Big Punch (1948) – Dr. LeRoy (uncredited)
 Embraceable You (1948) – Bus Station Ticket Clerk (uncredited)
 Johnny Belinda (1948) – Bailiff (uncredited)
 Smart Girls Don't Talk (1948) – Apartment House Clerk (uncredited)
 June Bride (1948) – Airplane Passenger (uncredited)
 Fighter Squadron (1948) – Cockney (uncredited)
 The Decision of Christopher Blake (1948) – Actor in Dream Play (uncredited)
 Whiplash (1948) – Man Leaving Nightclub (uncredited)
 John Loves Mary (1949) – Waiter (uncredited)
 Flaxy Martin (1949) – George – Tenement Resident (uncredited)
 A Kiss in the Dark (1949) – Tenant (uncredited)
 Homicide (1949) – Glorietta Desk Clerk (uncredited)
 Tulsa (1949) – Party Guest (uncredited)
 The Younger Brothers (1949) – Hotel Clerk (uncredited)
 Night Unto Night (1949) – Auto Court Workman (uncredited)
 The Fountainhead (1949) – Court Clerk (uncredited)
 One Last Fling (1949) – Gus, Bolton's Valet (uncredited)
 The Girl from Jones Beach (1949) – Waiter (uncredited)
 The House Across the Street (1949) – Newspaper Office Worker (uncredited)
 Beyond the Forest (1949) – Townsman with Glasses (uncredited)
 The Story of Seabiscuit (1949) – Oscar – Racetrack Spectator (uncredited)
 Always Leave Them Laughing (1949) – Hotel Clerk (uncredited)
 Montana (1950) – Rancher (uncredited)
 Backfire (1950) – Cab Driver (uncredited)
 Francis (1950) – Bank Employee (uncredited)
 Chain Lightning (1950) – Well-Wisher (uncredited)
 Perfect Strangers (1950) – Reporter (uncredited)
 The Daughter of Rosie O'Grady (1950) – Well-Wisher at Dressing Room Party (uncredited)
 The Flame and the Arrow (1950) – Undetermined role (uncredited)
 The Great Jewel Robber (1950) – Hotel Clerk (uncredited)
 Atom Man vs. Superman (1950, Serial) – Observer [Ch. 1] (uncredited)
 Sunset Boulevard (1950) – Himself (uncredited)
 The Enforcer (1951) – Music Store Clerk (uncredited)
 Goodbye, My Fancy (1951) – Griswolds' Butler (uncredited)
 Fort Worth (1951) – Railroad Backer (uncredited)
 On Moonlight Bay (1951) – Father in Silent Movie (uncredited)
 Painting the Clouds with Sunshine (1951) – Undetermined role (uncredited)
 Come Fill the Cup (1951) – Newspaperman (uncredited)
 Starlift (1951) – Theatre Manager (uncredited)
 The Girl in White (1952) – Instructor (uncredited)
 Scarlet Angel (1952) – Judge Ames (uncredited)
 Washington Story (1952) – Congressman (uncredited)
 Cattle Town (1952) – Townsman on Street (uncredited)
 Because You're Mine (1952) – Eye Examiner (uncredited)
 Million Dollar Mermaid (1952) – Husband on Beach (uncredited)
 Off Limits (1952) – Bar Patron (uncredited)
 So You Want to Learn to Dance (1953, Short) – Barber (uncredited)
 The System (1953) – Reporter at Senate Investigation Hearing (uncredited)
 Sangaree (1953) – Mr. Hale, plantation owner (uncredited)
 So This Is Love (1953) – Passerby (uncredited)
 Take the High Ground! (1953) – Army Doctor (uncredited)
 Walking My Baby Back Home (1953) – Edwards (uncredited)
 Phantom of the Rue Morgue (1954) – Concierge's Husband (uncredited)
 A Star Is Born (1954) – Undetermined role, crowd scene (uncredited)
 Strange Lady in Town (1955) – Card Player (uncredited)
 The McConnell Story (1955) – Fight Fan (uncredited)
 Illegal (1955) – Undetermined role, courtroom scene
 The Steel Jungle (1956) – Clerk
 Serenade (1956) – Assistant Stage Manager (uncredited)
 Our Miss Brooks (1956) – Faculty Member (uncredited)
 The She-Creature (1956) – Minor Role (uncredited)
 Top Secret Affair (1957) – Clerk at Senate Hearing (uncredited)
 The Spirit of St. Louis (1957) – Man Driving Car (uncredited)
 The Helen Morgan Story (1957) – Speakeasy Patron (uncredited)
 The Story of Mankind (1957) – Heavenly Judge (uncredited)
 Westbound (1959) – Irritated Stagecoach Passenger (uncredited) (final film role)

References

Further reading
 "Questions and Answers". Photoplay Magazine. January 1916. p. 167
 "Questions and Answers". Photoplay Magazine. February 1916. p. 161
 "Frank Powell Productions Organized". The New York Clipper. July 8, 1916. p. 19
 "Hale an Aviator". Moving Picture World. Vol. 29, No. 5. July 29, 1916. p. 772
 Sayford, I.S. (November 1916). "C. Hale, Human U-Boat". Photoplay Magazine. p. 135
 "Creighton Hale". Film Fun. January 1918. p. 22
 "Creighton Hale in Hollywood". Holly Leaves. December 22, 1922. p. 45
 "A Clever Actor Indeed". Close-Up. July 20, 1923. p. 9
 "'Trilby' Opens at the T. D. & L. Theater Today". Glendale Daily Press. September 28, 1923. p. 12
 "Creighton Hale in Vaudeville". Camera!. December 1, 1923. p. 13
 "Hollywood Has Film Orchestra". The Los Angeles Times. February 24, 1924.
 "Starts Actors' Orchestra". Los Angeles Evening Post-Record. March 3, 1924. p. 3
 "Creighton Hale Domestic". The Nebraska State Journal. May 25, 1924. p. 25
 "Creighton Hale in Cross Suit". Los Angeles Evening Post-Record. October 23, 1924. p. 2
 Marshall, Marian (December 2, 1924). "What Film Folk Are Now Doing; Hoot Gibson Makes Winter Scenes, Lytell Has Owl, Hale Sick". The Glendale Evening News. p. 8
 "Play a Conn Saxophone". Life. February 12, 1925. p. 27
 "Play a Conn Saxophone". Collier's. March 14, 1925. p. 49
 "Meet Creighton Hale, Pied Piper of Movies". Sunday News. October 25, 1925. p. 16
 "Play a Conn Saxophone". Science and Invention. January 1926. Volume XIII, No. 9. p. 869
 "Actor Cast in Romance Role". The Los Angeles Times. August 2, 1931. p. 32
 "Actor Refuses to Give Up Sons; Ceighton Hale Denies He Deserted Two Boys". The Los Angeles Times. July 13, 1932. p. 18 
 Pooler, James S. (August 9, 1938). "Serial Heroine and Villain Leave Successful Careers; What About Hero? Creighton Hale Is Still Seen on the Camera's Very Edge". Detroit Free Press. p. 16 
 "Options". Boxoffice. October 28, 1939. p. 43

External links

 
 

1882 births
1965 deaths
20th-century American male actors
20th-century Irish male actors
American male film actors
American male silent film actors
Irish emigrants to the United States (before 1923)
Irish expatriates in the United States
Irish male film actors
Irish male silent film actors
People educated at Ardingly College
People from County Cork